Collota (possibly from Quechua for mortar)  is a  mountain in the north of the Cordillera Blanca in the Andes of Peru. It is located in the Ancash Region, Huaylas Province, Yuracmarca District. It lies east of Milluacocha and Pilanco.

References

Mountains of Peru
Mountains of Ancash Region